Danielle Hunter (born October 29, 1994) is a Jamaican-born American football outside linebacker for the Minnesota Vikings of the National Football League (NFL). He played college football at LSU. He was drafted in the third round, 88th overall in the 2015 NFL Draft.

Early years
Born in St. Catherine, Jamaica on October 29, 1994, Hunter moved to the United States when he was 8 years old. He grew up in Katy, Texas, just west of Houston, where he attended Morton Ranch High School. He got signed up for youth football after a coach saw him playing tag with another boy who was trying to get away on roller skates. As a junior, he led his football team to their first Class 5A State Playoffs appearance despite playing defensive end for the first time as a freshman because he performed poorly in wide receiver tryouts. He tallied 63 tackles and seven sacks in his junior season. As a senior, he recorded 30 quarterback pressures, 11 tackles for losses, four sacks and four pass breakups on defense, while also catching four passes for 63 yards and a score on offense. In his final high school game against Lamar High School, he was credited with 16 stops. During his high school career, Hunter compiled 108 total tackles.

In track & field, Hunter competed in both sprinting and jumping events. Checking in at 6'6", 225 pounds, Hunter captured the district title in the high jump with a leap of 1.83 meters (6 feet, 0 inches) while also placing 5th in the long jump with a leap of 6.40 meters (20 feet, 11.5 inches) and 6th in the 400-meter dash with a time of 51.47 seconds at the 2011 District Meet.

Regarded as a four-star recruit by Rivals.com, Hunter was rated as the No. 37 prospect in the state of Texas. He was also ranked as the 14th best defensive end by Scout.com, 21st by Rivals.com and 34th by ESPN.com.

College career
Hunter attended Louisiana State University from 2012 to 2014, where he was a two-year starter at defensive end for the Tigers. He played in 38 games with 23 starts in three years, and started 23 straight games at defensive end. He opted to forgo his final season at LSU and declared for the 2015 NFL Draft in January 2015. He finished his college career with 142 tackles, 21.0 tackles for loss (79 yards), 4.5 sacks (27 yards), eight pass breakups, seven quarterback hurries, and two forced fumbles (including a touchdown on a 25-yard fumble return).

Freshman season (2012)

As a true freshman in 2012, Hunter was only 17 years old. He saw action in 12 games with no starts, playing most of the time on special teams, including kickoff coverage. He was active in every game with the exception of the South Carolina game in October 13. He had a season-high three tackles in a win over Idaho on September 15. Hunter ended his first year with 12 tackles, including three solo.

Sophomore season (2013)

As a sophomore in 2013, Hunter played in 13 games, starting 10 of them after breaking into the starting lineup on September 21 against Auburn. In that game, his first start, he recorded a then career-best eight tackles and a quarterback hurry in a 35-21 win over the eventual national runner-up. He had an outstanding all-around game in a win over Florida with seven tackles, one tackle for loss and two pass breakups. He closed the year with four tackles, including a sack for a 4-yard loss, in the win over Iowa in the 2014 Outback Bowl. Hunter finished the season with 57 tackles, 8.0 tackles for loss, 3.0 sacks, five quarterback hurries and a pair of pass breaksups.

Junior season (2014)

Hunter returned as a starter for his junior year in 2014. For the first time in his career, he played and started all 13 games for the Tigers, contributing as a key member of an LSU defense that led the SEC in total yards (316.8 Y/G) and pass defense (164.2 Y/G) and ranked No. 2 in the league in scoring defense with 17.5 points per game. In the season opener game, he helped the Tiger defense limit Wisconsin to 32 yards on 19 plays over the final 27 minutes of the contest as LSU erased a 17-point deficit to beat the Badgers 28-24. Against Mississippi State, he had six tackles, a sack and scooped up a Dak Prescott fumble on the first play of the second half, racing 25 yards for a touchdown. After setting a career-high in tackles with 12 against Auburn in week 4, he became the first LSU defensive lineman with double-digit tackles in a game since Glenn Dorsey had 11 tackles against Ole Miss on November 28, 2006. He was the first LSU defender to score on a fumble return since Tyrann Mathieu did it on a 23-yard return in win over Kentucky on October 1, 2011. In LSU's win over Kentucky in week 8, he had one of his best all-around games with six tackles, 2.0 tackles for loss, a quarterback hurry and three pass breakups. He played a key role in LSU's upset win over third-ranked Ole Miss with nine tackles, including two for losses, in a 10-7 win over the Rebels. He closed out the season with nine tackles, including one for a 4-yard loss, against Notre Dame in the Music City Bowl. For the season, Hunter recorded 73 tackles, including 30 solo stops, 1.5 sacks, six pass breakups and a pair of quarterback hurries. His 13.0 tackles for loss ranked 10th in the SEC.

College statistics

Professional career
Following his junior season, Hunter entered the 2015 NFL Draft. Described as a defensive end with tremendous athletic upside and a good motor, Hunter was often compared to Giants defensive end Jason Pierre-Paul in terms of his similar length, burst and potential.

At the 2015 NFL Combine, Hunter registered a time of 4.57 seconds in the 40-yard dash, the fastest time among all defensive linemen. He also did 25 repetitions on the 225-pound bench press.

Hunter was selected by the Minnesota Vikings in the third round of the 2015 NFL Draft with the 88th pick overall. The pick was part of a trade where the Vikings traded back in the third round, giving up their 80th overall pick for the third- and fifth-rounders (88th and 143rd overall) of the Detroit Lions. As a rookie in 2015, Hunter was the youngest player in the NFL, but quickly managed to earn a rotational role on defense and finished second among all NFL rookies and second in the team in sacks with 6.0. After two seasons in Minnesota, Hunter compiled 18.5 career sacks and four games in which he finished the day with at least 1.5 sacks. Since 1985, only Keith Millard and Kevin Williams registered more sacks than Hunter in their first two NFL seasons with the Vikings.

2015 season
In his first career start, Hunter had four tackles, half a sack and was credited with a forced fumble in the Vikings’ 16-10 victory over the Kansas City Chiefs in week 6. The forced fumble ended the Chiefs’ second-to-last drive of the game. In week 8 against the Chicago Bears, Hunter recorded a sack and a tackle. In week 15, Hunter continued to see an expanded role on the defensive line as he played 48 of 64 snaps in the Vikings' blowout win over the Chicago Bears 38-17, recording 1.5 sacks and five total tackles. Hunter finished the season with 33 total  tackles (29 of them solo), 10 tackles for loss, 6.0 sacks, 25 quarterback pressures, 1 pass defensed and a forced fumble. On January 19, 2016, Hunter was named to the Pro Football Writers of America's (PFWA) 2015 NFL All-Rookie team.

2016 season
Hunter scored the first touchdown of his professional career on a 24-yard fumble return against the Tennessee Titans. Shortly after his fumble return, he broke through to sack Marcus Mariota deep in his own territory. Against the Green Bay Packers in Week 2, he was credited with 4 tackles and a strip sack as the Vikings opened their new U.S. Bank Stadium with a 17–14 victory. In Week 3 with the Vikings trailing 10-0 to the Carolina Panthers late in the first quarter, Hunter shoved left tackle Michael Oher to the turf and eluded guard Andrew Norwell to sack Cam Newton in the end zone for a safety. It was the first safety since Jared Allen had one on December 4, 2011 against the Denver Broncos. Hunter had his first career multi-sack game in Week 11 against the Arizona Cardinals, helping the Vikings end their four-game losing streak. Against the Dallas Cowboys in Week 13, Hunter had his second two-sack game of the season. In 16 games with the Vikings in 2016, Hunter accumulated 54 total tackles, 12.5 sacks (including a safety), one forced fumble, and one fumble recovery for a touchdown despite the fact that he did not start a single game. He was also credited with 55 quarterback hurries according to Sam Monson at Pro Football Focus (PFF). Hunter was the only Viking to be featured on NFL.com analyst Elliot Harrison's All-Under-25 team.

2017 season
In week 4 against the Detroit Lions, Hunter sacked quarterback Matthew Stafford twice and defended a pass during the 14–7 loss.  These sacks were Hunter's first of the season.
In week 8 against the Cleveland Browns in London, Hunter forced a fumble on running back Isaiah Crowell which was recovered by teammate Anthony Harris on the first offensive play of the second half.  The Vikings eventually won the game 33–16.
Hunter recorded a sack in the next three games against the Redskins, Rams, and Lions respectively.  Hunter finished the regular season with 45 tackles, 7 sacks, one forced fumble, one fumble recovery, and two passes defended in 16 games started.

In the divisional round of the playoffs against the New Orleans Saints, Hunter recorded one tackle during the 29–24 win which became known as the Minneapolis Miracle.
In the NFC Championship game against the Philadelphia Eagles, Hunter recorded 5 tackles and sacked Nick Foles once during the 38–7 loss.

2018 season
On June 27, 2018, Hunter signed a five-year, $72 million extension with the Vikings with $40 million guaranteed and a $15 million signing bonus. Hunter had a strong start to the 2018 season, recording at least one sack in each of the Vikings' first seven games, including 2 sacks against the Arizona Cardinals in Week 6. In Week 9, Hunter recorded a career-high 3.5 sacks, nine tackles, and returned a fumble recovery 32 yards for a touchdown in a 24-9 win over the Detroit Lions, earning him NFC Defensive Player of the Week. In that same game, the Vikings set a new franchise record with 10 sacks. Hunter would finish the 2018 season with 72 total tackles, 14.5 sacks, 21 tackles for loss, and one fumble recovery for a touchdown. Hunter's 14.5 sacks tied him with Von Miller for fourth most in the NFL. For these efforts, Hunter was awarded his first trip to the Pro Bowl, where he recorded a sack against Andrew Luck. In addition to the Pro Bowl nomination, Hunter was also named Second-team All-Pro by the Associated Press and First-team All-Pro by Sporting News and the PFWA.

2019 season
In week 1 against the Atlanta Falcons, Hunter recorded his first sack of the season on Matt Ryan as the Vikings won 28–12.
In week 2 against the Green Bay Packers, Hunter sacked Aaron Rodgers once in the 21–16 loss.
In week 3 against the Oakland Raiders, Hunter sacked Derek Carr once in the 34–14 win.
In week 5 against the New York Giants, Hunter sacked rookie quarterback Daniel Jones twice in the 28–10 win.
In week 7 against the Detroit Lions, Hunter recorded 3 tackles and sacked Matthew Stafford once in the 42–30 win.
In week 8 against the Washington Redskins, Hunter recorded a strip sack on Case Keenum that was recovered by teammate Shamar Stephen in the 19–9 win.
In week 14 against the Lions, Hunter sacked rookie quarterback David Blough 3 times in the 20–7 win, earning him NFC Defensive Player of the Week. In the game, Hunter became the youngest player in NFL history to reach 50 sacks.
In week 15 against the Los Angeles Chargers, Hunter sacked quarterback Philip Rivers once, forced a fumble on running back Melvin Gordon which was recovered by Harrison Smith, and recovered a fumble forced by Shamar Stephen on Gordon during the 39–10 win.
Hunter finished the regular season with 70 tackles, 14.5 sacks, three forced fumbles, and one fumble recovery in 16 games started.
On December 17, 2019, Hunter was nominated to play in his second straight Pro Bowl.

In the NFC Wild Card game against the New Orleans Saints, Hunter recorded a strip sack on Drew Brees which was recovered by teammate Jalyn Holmes during the 26–20 overtime win.
In the Divisional Round against the San Francisco 49ers, Hunter sacked Jimmy Garoppolo once during the 27–10 loss.

2020 season
On September 9, 2020, Hunter was placed on injured reserve with a neck injury. He underwent season-ending surgery to clean up a herniated disc in his neck.

2021 season
Hunter started off the season in a torrid pace netting 6 sacks in the first 7 games when he suffered a season ending torn pectoral muscle placing him on injured reserve for the 2nd consecutive season.

NFL career statistics

References

External links
Minnesota Vikings bio
LSU Tigers bio

1994 births
Living people
American football defensive ends
American football outside linebackers
Jamaican emigrants to the United States
Jamaican players of American football
LSU Tigers football players
Minnesota Vikings players
People from Katy, Texas
People from Saint Catherine Parish
Players of American football from Texas
Sportspeople from Harris County, Texas
National Conference Pro Bowl players